A decimal (also spelled decimel ) is a unit of area in Bangladesh. After metrication in the mid-20th century by both countries, the unit became officially obsolete. But among the rural population in Northern Bangladesh and West Bengal, it is still in use. It is also used for water measuring of pond

Decimals are also used as a measure of land in West Africa. 

1 decimal always equal to 1/100 acre. which is equals to 435.6 sq. feet or 40.468564 m2 ( .

Note: 
Length Unit (fixed):
१ जरीब = १०० कड़ी = ४४ हाथ = ६६ फ़ीट = २२ गज।
∴ 1 हाथ = 1½ फ़ीट।

Area Units (fixed):
१ बीघा = २० कठा = ४०० धुर = ८००० धुरकी।
१००० वर्ग कड़ी = १ डिसमल = ४३५.६ वर्ग फ़ीट।
१०० डिसमील = १ एकड़ होता है
१ धुर = १ लग्गी × १ लग्गी।

लग्गी: हर मौजा का लग्गी अलग अलग होसकता है। पता करें अपने मौजा का लग्गी कितना है। यदि आपके मौजे का इकाई 5½ हाथ का १ लग्गी है तो: 1 लग्गी = 5½ हाथ = 5½ × 1½ फ़ीट = 8¼फ़ीट।
& 1 धुर = 1 लग्गी × 1 लग्गी। (5.5 is most common but 4, 4.5, 5 and other exist depending on precision they needed)
∴ 1धुर = 8¼फ़ीट × 8¼फ़ीट। (केवल 5½ हाथ का १ लग्गी के लिए)
∴ 1धुर = 68.0625 वर्ग फ़ीट। (केवल 5½ हाथ का १ लग्गी के लिए)

See also
List of customary units of measurement in South Asia

References

 

Customary units in India
Obsolete units of measurement
Units of area